The Planning and Development Act 2005 is an Act of the Western Australian Parliament which lays down specific controls over planning at a metropolitan and local level as well as establishing more general controls over the subdivision of land. The Act consolidated the Town Planning and Development Act 1928, Metropolitan Region Town Planning Scheme Act 1959 and the Western Australian Planning Commission Act 1985 into a single piece of legislation.

References
 Hedgcock, D. O, Yiftachel. 1992. Urban and Regional Planning in Western Australia. Paradigm Press: Perth.
 
 
 Allens Arthur Robinson, April, 2006

See also
Metropolitan Region Scheme

Western Australia legislation
2005 in Australian law
2000s in Western Australia
Urban planning in Australia